Panchvalley is a Hill Valley made up of 5 hills Panch Valley located in the south of Madhya Pradesh State around Chhindwara in the Region of Parasia, Chhindwara in Chhindwara District. It covers an area of 240 km2.

See also
 Chhindwara
 Madhya Pradesh

Landforms of Madhya Pradesh
Cities and towns in Chhindwara district
Valleys of India